Styrian Seeberg Pass (also the Aflenzer Seeberg) (el. 1253 m.) is a high mountain pass in the Austrian Alps, located in the Bundesland of Styria, east of the Hochschwab Mountains. The pass forms the most important connection between the Mürz Valley at Kapfenberg and the pilgrimage destination of Mariazell (as well as neighboring Lower Austria). At the same time, it forms the division between the watersheds of the Mur and the Enns.

The Styrian Seeberg's name serves to differentiate from Seeberg Saddle on the border between Carinthia and Slovenia, which is also called the Carinthian Seeberg.

See also
 List of highest paved roads in Europe
 List of mountain passes

Mountain passes of Styria
Mountain passes of the Alps